Dickson College is a public two-year secondary college located in the Canberra suburb of Dickson, Australian Capital Territory.  It was established in 1976 on the former Dickson High School campus when it closed.

It was set to close after being announced as the sole college in Canberra to be eliminated for the Towards 2020 plan, but was spared when the final decision was made.

The college draws its students from Canberra's inner north, principally taking students from Campbell and Lyneham High Schools.

Enrollment 
Currently there are just under 1000 students enrolled at Dickson College. The feeder schools are Lyneham High School, Campbell High School, and Emmaus High School.

Curriculum 
Students are prepared for the ACT Year 12 Certificate, as mandated by the Department of Education and Board of Senior Secondary Studies.

More than half of Dickson College students who graduate with a Year 12 Certificate also obtain an ATAR and go on to study at university. In 2007 of the 215 students awarded a Year 12 certificate, 61% were awarded Tertiary Education Statements. In 2007, the median UAI gained by students of Dickson College was 78 compared with the average of students from all across ACT colleges of 79. Over 78% of students from the college who were awarded Tertiary Education Statements in 2007 scored over 65 for their UAI compared with 70% of all ACT students. 68 students were awarded a vocational certificate in 2007 and 131 students were awarded a vocational statement of attainment.

See also 
 List of schools in the Australian Capital Territory

Notable alumni 

David Branson, artist, theatre director, actor and musician
 Jackie Chan, actor, filmmaker and martial artist (attended Dickson College in 1971)
 Taro Gold, author, entertainer and entrepreneur (attended Dickson College in 1985)
 Sussan Ley, politician
 Garth Nix, author of young adult fantasy novels

References

External links
 Dickson College website
 

High schools in the Australian Capital Territory
Public schools in the Australian Capital Territory